The 2019 New Mexico Bowl was a college football bowl game played on December 21, 2019, with kickoff at 2:00 p.m. EST (12:00 p.m. local MST) on ESPN. It was the 14th edition of the New Mexico Bowl, and one of the 2019–20 bowl games concluding the 2019 FBS football season.

The 2019 edition of the New Mexico Bowl did not have a corporate naming sponsor. The game was going to be sponsored by DreamHouse, an Albuquerque-based company focused on the film industry. However, the company was found to be a fraudulent enterprise, operating without a business license, and the sponsorship agreement was cancelled.

Teams
This was the first time that Central Michigan and San Diego State played each other, and the first time either played in the New Mexico Bowl.

Central Michigan Chippewas

Central Michigan entered the game with an 8–5 record (6–2 in conference). The Chippewas finished atop the West Division of the Mid-American Conference (MAC), before losing the MAC Championship Game to Miami (Ohio), 21–26.

San Diego State Aztecs

San Diego State entered the game with a 9–3 record (5–3 in conference). They finished even with Hawaii atop the West Division of the Mountain West Conference, with the division title going to the Rainbow Warriors due to their 14–11 defeat of the Aztecs during the regular season.

Game summary

Statistics

References

External links

Game statistics at statbroadcast.com

New Mexico Bowl
New Mexico Bowl
New Mexico Bowl
New Mexico Bowl
Central Michigan Chippewas football bowl games
San Diego State Aztecs football bowl games